Swarnappakshikal is a 1981 Indian Malayalam film, directed by P. R. Nair and produced by Vasanthi. The film stars Sukumari, Nedumudi Venu, Jose Prakash and Nagavally R. S. Kurup in the lead roles. The film has musical score by Raveendran.

Cast

Sukumaran
Nedumudi Venu
Jose Prakash
Nagavally R. S. Kurup
Sukumari
Alummoodan
Jagannatha Varma
Jalaja
Leela Namboothiri
Muralimohan
Nellikode Bhaskaran
Swapna

Soundtrack
The music was composed by Raveendran and the lyrics were written by Mullanezhi.

References

External links
 

1981 films
1980s Malayalam-language films